Can Togay (born August 27, 1955), also known as János Can Togay, is a Hungarian film director, screenwriter, actor, poet, producer, cultural manager and cultural diplomat.

Biography 
Can Togay was born the son of Turkish parents. He spent his childhood in Germany. In 1969, he joined the Péter Halász troupe. Between 1973 and 1978, he studied on the German and English faculty of Eötvös Loránd University, followed by two years of post-graduate work on German-French comparative linguistics under Jean-Marie Zemb of the Sorbonne Nouvelle in Paris. He finished in 1980. In 1984, he graduated from the faculty of direction of the Színház- és Filmművészeti Főiskola (College of Theatrical and Video Arts) in Budapest as the student of Zoltán Fábri. In 1991 he moved to Finland for four years.

His 1992 film A nyaraló was screened in the Un Certain Regard section at the 1992 Cannes Film Festival.

In 1978, he had poems published in the Mozgó Világ (Moving World). In 2004, his first collection of poems was released by the publisher Aranykor Kiadó (Golden Age Publisher). He conceived the idea of the Holocaust Memorial Cipők a Duna-parton (Shoes on the Danube Promenade) in Budapest, and was also a co-maker of it   with Gyula Pauer.

Since January 1, 2008, he is the head of the Collegium Hungaricum Berlin, the Hungarian Institute for Science and Culture in the German capital and the cultural attaché of the Hungarian Embassy.

Works

Awards 
 Balázs Béla-award
 München, High School Film Festival, Award for Best High School Program, Special Mention – The Day of the Devil
 Manuscrit de Vercorin screenplay award 95 – A Winter in The Back of Beyond
 Budapesti Filmszemle 1999, Award for Best Actor (Eperjes Károly) – A Winter in The Back of Beyond
 Szocsi 00 international competition – Surcharge of the Jury – A Winter in The Back of Beyond
 Alexandria Filmfesztivál 1994, Best Male Actor – An Autumn Story
 Movie Actor of the Year – Award of the Turkish Movie Actors' Association – An Autumn Story

References

External links 

1955 births
Living people
Hungarian film directors
Hungarian screenwriters
Male screenwriters
Hungarian male writers
Eötvös Loránd University alumni
University of Paris alumni
Hungarian male film actors
Hungarian people of Turkish descent
Male actors from Budapest